Joe McKinney (born September 22, 1968) (died July 13, 2021) was a San Antoniobased author and Patrol Supervisor with the San Antonio Police Department.

Career 

Joe McKinney is an author in many genres, including horror, ghost stories, virus thrillers, crime and science fiction. Over his career, he has written thirteen novels, developed two collections of short stories, created a tale for a comic book, and been both published in and edited numerous anthologies. He is also a regular contributor to the online true crime magazine, In Cold Blog.

In addition, McKinney is a sergeant with the San Antonio Police Department as the Patrol Supervisor for the West side of San Antonio. Previous to that, he's been a homicide detective and disaster mitigation specialist. He's also helped run the city’s 911 Dispatch Center.

Many of his works contain a strong procedural element and a level of realism based on his years of law enforcement. He's addressed some of the prejudice against female officers, both from the public and from their fellow officer in his novels Quarantined and Flesh Eaters. In Inheritance, he includes more in-station activities between police officers.

In The Savage Dead (2013), McKinney addressed the border relations between the United States and Mexico. Mixing the genres of political thriller, military special ops thriller, and zombie gorefest, the novel tackles this complex topic from a number of different angles.

His first Young Adult publication, Dog Days, was released in 2013 as part of Journalstone's Doubledown Series, Book III, paired with Sanford Allen's Deadly Passage. Noted as a coming of age novel, Max, the 14-year-old narrator of Dog Days, spends the summer of 1983 facing the worst hurricane the suburbs of Houston have endured in memory, as well as the possibility of a supernatural killer. Dog Days won the Bram Stoker Award for Superior Achievement in a YA Novel of 2013.

A lifelong Texan, McKinney also enjoys exploring the history of South Texas, legends of famous and/or little known outlaws, and the mysteries of long unsolved crimes.

Personal life 

Joe McKinney died in his sleep July 13, 2021.  He is survived by his wife and two daughters.

Awards

2009 nominee: Bram Stoker Award for Superior Achievement in a Novel for Quarantined
2010 nominee: Bram Stoker Award for Superior Achievement in a Novel for Apocalypse of the Dead (Deadworld #2)
2012 winner: Bram Stoker Award for Best Novel of 2011 for Flesh Eaters (Deadworld #3)
2014 winner: Bram Stoker Award for Superior Achievement in a YA Novel of 2013 for Dog Days

Bibliography 

McKinney is the author of, or a contributor to, thirty books.

Dead City (Deadworld #1) – (2006) 
Apocalypse of the Dead (Deadworld #2) – (2010) 
Flesh Eaters (Deadworld #3) – (2011) 
The Crossing (Deadworld short story) – (2012) 
Mutated (Deadworld #4) – (2012) 
The Savage Dead (Deadworld #5) – (2013) 
Quarantined – (2009) 
Dead Set: A Zombie Anthology – (Editor) (2010) 
The Sound of Horror – (2007) 
The Phantom Chronicles 2 – (2009) 
The Red Empire – (2011) 
The Weaponer – (2010) 
The Green Hornet Casefiles – (2011) 
The Green Hornet Casefiles – (2011) )
Dodging Bullets – (2010) 
Book of Horror 2 – (2011) 
Best New Zombie Tales (Vol.3) – (2011)
Horror For Good: A Charitable Anthology (Volume 1) – (2012) 
End of Days5: An Apocalyptic Anthology – (Contributor) (2011) 
Inheritance – (2012) 
Blood Rites: An Invitation to Horror – (Contributor) (2014) 
Zombie Writing! – (Contributor) (2012) Help! Wanted – (Contributor) (2011) 
Dog Days – Deadly Passage – (Dual Publication with Sanford Allen) (2013) Crooked House – (2013) Lost Girl of the Lake – (Co-Authored with Mike McCarty) (2014) Nightmare Stalkers & Dream Walkers – (Contributor) (2014) 
Retreat: Pandemic – (Co-Authored with Craig DiLouie and Stephen Knight) (2013) ASIN B00GQOG166Retreat: Slaughterhouse – (Co-Authored with Stephen Knight and Craig DiLouie) (2014) ASIN B00K3BRRDY
Plague of the Undead – (The Deadlands #1) (2014) The Dead Won't Die – (The Deadlands #2) (2015)

References

External links 
Official Website

American horror writers
American crime writers
Writers from San Antonio
Living people
1968 births
American male novelists